Salem Reidan (born 13 June 1991 in Budapest) is a professional Hungarian footballer currently plays for Vasas SC.

Club statistics

Updated to games played as of 21 November 2012.

External links
 HLSZ 
 MLSZ 

1991 births
Living people
Footballers from Budapest
Hungarian footballers
Association football midfielders
Vasas SC players